Alexis Dos Santos (born 1974) is an Argentine film director and producer, screenwriter and editor. He has also shot a number of short and directed music videos. He is considered part of the New Queer Cinema movement.

Dos Santos studied in Buenos Aires and Barcelona before relocating to London in 1998, where he attended the National Film and Television School. He started filming short films like Meteoritos, Watching Planes, Axolotll, Snapshots and Sand.

In 2006, he wrote and directed his debut long feature Glue (full title Glue - Historia adolescente en medio de la nada) about young musicians in drug use and sexual exploration. It won a number of prizes including the MovieZone Award at the International Film Festival Rotterdam (IFFR) in 2007 In 2009, he directed Unmade Beds that was featured at the 2009 Sundance Film Festival and at Febiofest 2010. The film was partially funded by the UK Film Council and was nominated for Grand Jury Prize - World Cinema / Dramatic in Sundance Festival. For the Cinema Reloaded project, in 2011 he directed the short film Random Strangers.

Filmography

Directing and screenwriting
Feature films
2006: Glue 
2009: Unmade Beds
2019: Monos - (Screenwriter)

Shorts
1997: Meteoritos 
2001: Sand
2002: Axolotl
2011: Random Strangers

Editing
2013: Bends

Producing
1997: Meteoritos
2006: Glue
2013: Night

Acting
1997: Meteoritos
2009: Unmade Beds as Alejo

Music videos
(Selective)
2011: Matt Fishel - "The First Time"

Awards and nominations
Glue
2006: Won MovieZone Award at the Rotterdam International Film Festival (IFFR)
2006: Won Best Local Film at Buenos Aires International Festival of Independent Cinema
2006: Won Young Audience Award at Nantes Three Continents Festival
2006: Nominated for Golden Montgolfiere at the Nantes Three Continents Festival
2007: Won Best First Feature - World Cinema at the San Francisco International Lesbian & Gay Film Festival

Unmade Beds
2009: Nominated for Grand Jury Prize - World Cinema / Dramatic during Sundance Film Festival
2009: Won Crystal Arrow at Les Arcs European Film Festival
2009: Won Quebec Film Critics Award / Special Mention at Montréal Festival of New Cinema

References

External links

Argentine film directors
Argentine film producers
Argentine screenwriters
Male screenwriters
Argentine male writers
1974 births
Living people